(also known as All About Our House) is a 2001 comedy film written and directed by Japanese director Kōki Mitani.  The film is about an affluent couple who decide to build a new house, and the clash between traditional Japanese and modern western styles between the people they hire to build it.

Cast members include Naoki Tanaka (Iijima Naosuke, the husband), Akiko Yagi (Iijima Tamiko, the wife), Toshiaki Karasawa (Yanagisawa, the interior designer) and Kunie Tanaka (Tamiko's father, the builder).

The film was nominated for six Japanese Academy Awards.  Naoki Tanaka and Akiko Yagi were named as Newcomers of the Year; Tanaka also won the Most Popular Performer prize.

Plot
Naosuke and Tamiko are a happily married couple, and have just bought some land in the countryside to build their new house on.  They ask Yanagisawa, Tamiko's junior at university and an interior designer to design it.  However, because he is not a qualified architect, they need someone else to apply for consent and built it.  They ask Tamiko's father, a builder, to do this.

Yanagisawa is a modernist, influenced by American architecture; Tamako's father is a traditionalist.  The two soon come into conflict over the design of the house.  After many disagreements, they eventually start to understand each other's way of thinking.  The house is successfully completed.

Cast
 Toshiaki Karasawa
 Akiko Yagi
 Kunie Tanaka
 Nobuo Yana
 Shōbun Inoue
 Tsuyoshi Ihara
 Yoko Nogiwa
 Akira Fuse
 Kiichi Nakai

Further reading

References

External links 
 

2001 films
Films directed by Kōki Mitani
Japanese comedy films
2001 comedy films
Films with screenplays by Kôki Mitani
Films scored by Takayuki Hattori
2000s Japanese films